"Nippy" is the tenth episode of the sixth season of Better Call Saul, the spin-off television series of Breaking Bad. It was directed by Michelle MacLaren and written by Alison Tatlock. The episode aired on AMC and AMC+ on July 25, 2022, before debuting online in certain territories on Netflix the following day. "Nippy" continues the story of Jimmy McGill, portrayed by Bob Odenkirk, after he changed his identity and relocated to Omaha. In the episode, Jimmy confronts the taxi driver who recognized him as Saul Goodman.

"Nippy" received generally positive reviews, particularly for Tatlock's screenplay, MacLaren's direction, and Odenkirk's performance. However, the casting and performance of Pat Healy drew mixed reviews, and some felt the episode had little purpose in the show's narrative. An estimated 1.20 million viewers saw the episode during its first broadcast on AMC.

Plot 
In Omaha, Nebraska, in 2010, the motorized chair of an elderly woman named Marion gets stuck in the snow. Jimmy McGill, under the guise of Gene Takavic, appears and offers his assistance, stealthily snipping the chair's power cables, and subsequently offering to push her to her home. He befriends her with stories of Nippy, his supposedly missing dog. Marion is revealed to be the mother of Jeff, the cab driver who recognized Gene as Saul Goodman. Jeff arrives home and questions Gene's motives. Gene offers Jeff a chance to enter "the game" by burgling a department store in the mall where Gene works in exchange for Jeff's silence about Gene's true identity. Gene returns home, puts on the pinky ring he inherited from Marco, and begins to prepare.

Over several days, Gene befriends mall security guard Frank by bringing him Cinnabon rolls and talking about Nebraska Cornhuskers football, tracking how long it takes for Frank to eat while sitting with his back to the security camera monitors. He then recreates the layout of the department store in a field and choreographs an efficient way for Jeff to maximize his takings. On the night of the burglary, he has Jeff's friend, Buddy deliver a box containing Jeff to the loading dock to get Jeff into the mall after hours and to hide the loot afterwards. During the burglary, Jeff accidentally falls on a slippery floor, disrupting the timing of the scheme, but Gene feigns a depressive episode to divert Frank's attention. The burglary succeeds, and Jeff hides in the bathroom overnight, then leaves the store when it opens in the morning. As they relish their success, Gene warns that if Jeff reveals Gene's true identity, Gene will report the burglary as a form of "mutual assured destruction", and makes Jeff promise never to cross paths with him again. When Gene returns to the mall, he finds a Saul Goodman-style dress shirt in the department store but leaves without purchasing it.

Production 
"Nippy" is the third Better Call Saul episode to be directed by Michelle MacLaren, after the first season's "Mijo" and the fourth season's "Breathe". It was written by executive producer Alison Tatlock. Bob Odenkirk, who plays Jimmy, is the only actor listed in the starring credits. 

The cab driver Jeff, previously portrayed by Don Harvey, was recast to Pat Healy due to a work conflict by Harvey. Healy originally auditioned for the role of Jeff during the production of the fourth season in March 2018, but was not hired. He was notified of Harvey's departure after he finished shooting his scenes for Martin Scorsese's Killers of the Flower Moon. Healy emphasized that the recast was not due to scheduling changes after Odenkirk's heart attack during the production of a previous episode in the sixth season, as he was cast before this incident. Harvey later expressed disappointment in not being able to reprise the role due to scheduling conflicts, but praised Healy for making the character his own. AMC released several teasers to inform viewers of Jeff's recast weeks prior to the episode's airing. The promotional material featured clips of Healy in the role along with lines of Jeff's character from previous seasons that Healy had re-recorded in a sound booth in Los Angeles. 

Carol Burnett guest starred as Jeff's mother Marion. She was a fan of both Breaking Bad and Better Call Saul, and had appeared on The Larry Sanders Show with Odenkirk, but the two did not share any scenes in that series. Series creator Vince Gilligan later stated that Burnett's arrival on the set raised the morale of the cast and crew, who had all grown exhausted from the season's extended production.

Though the story takes place in Omaha, Nebraska, the mall scenes were shot at the Cottonwood Mall in Albuquerque, New Mexico. The department store where the heist takes place was an empty space in the mall. The production designer and art department built the interior and every item in the store was created, purchased, or brought in. The first scene that Healy filmed for the episode was Jeff's nervous exit from the store bathroom. MacLaren directed Healy in that scene to "walk like you've got hemorrhoids". Healy said filming the heist scene, which sometimes meant he had to run for ten hours in a day, was exhausting. MacLaren described the work as both complicated and joyous, praising Burnett for striking a balance between comedy and drama in her performance. She said of the heist scene, "when we were shooting it, I turned to everybody as I was practically falling out of my chair because I was laughing so hard".

"Nippy" marks a number of firsts for Better Call Saul. It is the first episode set entirely after Breaking Bad and the first to take place entirely in Gene's black-and-white timeline, an idea co-creator Peter Gould mentioned in February 2020. It is also the first of the sixth season to not follow the "X and Y" naming scheme, and marked a change in the title credits. Traditionally, the title credits of each season's tenth episode featured Saul Goodman's "World's Greatest Lawyer" mug falling off his desk and shattering on the floor. However, in this episode, the title image prematurely stops and is replaced by a blue screen, recreating the effects of a home video recording on a VCR. The music piece "Jim on the Move" by Lalo Schifrin, from the 1966 television series Mission: Impossible, is included in the episode's score. Editing was completed by Chris McCaleb and Joey Liew.

Reception

Critical response 

The episode received generally positive reviews. On the review aggregator Rotten Tomatoes, 90% of ten reviews are positive with an average rating of 9.5/10. Crew members that were recognized for their work on "Nippy" included writer Alison Tatlock and director Michelle MacLaren. Bob Odenkirk also received praise for his performance as Gene Takavic, particularly in the scene where he feigns a breakdown. Alan Sepinwall of Rolling Stone described the episode as an unpredictable epilogue to Better Call Saul that "brings emotional color, thrills, and fun". Steve Greene of IndieWire thought "Nippy" was a reminder that the series did not need high stakes to be entertaining. Ashley Bissette Sumerel of Tell-Tale TV said she enjoyed the humor and watching the heist play out on screen. "Even though the tone is more somber," she wrote, "it's still great fun". Scott Tobias of Vulture called it a "brilliant and wholly unexpected stand-alone episode". Vanity Fairs Mike Hogan labeled it a bottle episode that he believed would set the stage for the rest of the season. David Segal of The New York Times did not like the episode. He experienced some confusion over the recasting of Jeff and said it "felt low-stakes and a bit broad". Erik Kain of Forbes''' found the casting jarring, and noted that it had been over two years since the character Jeff had first appeared. Kain called it "the first genuinely bad episode of Better Call Saul" and said that the episode  "tries to achieve some sort of triumph for Saul but fails to stick the landing, losing all momentum in the process." Decider'' included "Nippy" in its list of "The Best TV Episodes of 2022".

Ratings 
An estimated 1.20 million viewers watched "Nippy" during its first broadcast on AMC on July 25, 2022.

Notes

References

External links 
 "Nippy" at AMC
 

2022 American television episodes
Better Call Saul (season 6) episodes
Black-and-white television episodes